Quentin Curry (born 1972, Johnstown, Pennsylvania) is an artist based in New York City. He specialises in semi-abstract landscapes, such as scenic views and industrial wastelands, painted with a mixture of stone dust and oil paint pressed through fabric to produce textured canvasses.

About
Curry spent his childhood living between Pennsylvania and Florida where he quickly became acclimated to both the rural and urban life. He moved to Vermont at age 17. Since 1996, Curry has been living in New York City.

Education
Curry attended The Putney School. From 1991 to 1992, he attended Bard College and from 1994 to 1995 went to the San Francisco Art Institute.

Career
Curry uses a unique technique in his art which is unlike many artists. He applies multiple layers of enamel paint mixed with the dust from stones. Most of his works incorporate industrial landscapes and historical figures. He describes his creative process as painting with three-dimensinal relief. The result of this process is a brilliant work bringing the observer into Curry's universe. Curry's most recent work in 2009, "Founder" presents a portrait of President Abraham Lincoln from a different perspective.

Exhibitions
His work has been shown at a number of exhibitions which include:
Modern Amusements
Outdoor Sculpture Show'
Line
Urban Organics
Stellan Holm Gallery
New York and Kantor/Feuer in Los Angeles
63 Eleven Gallery, Seattle
DNA Gallery, Provincetown, Massachusetts
Markham Murray Gallery, New York City 
Nightingale Gallery, Water Mill, New York

References

External links
Quentin Curry at Kantor/Feuer
Quentin Curry – Painting – Saatchi Gallery
Quentin Curry at Gallery 63 Eleven

1972 births
Living people
20th-century American painters
American male painters
21st-century American painters
Bard College alumni
San Francisco Art Institute alumni
20th-century American male artists